Giant orchid is a common name for several plants and may refer to:

Grammatophyllum speciosum, native from New Guinea to the Philippines and one of the world's largest orchids
Orthochilus ecristatus, native to the southeastern United States